The timeline of the Universe lists events from its creation to its ultimate final state. 

For a timeline of the universe from formation to the present day, see: Timeline of cosmological epochs
For a timeline of the universe from the present to its presumed conclusion, see: Timeline of the far future

See also
Chronology of the universe
Timelines of world history